Landi Tehsil  is a subdivision located in Khyber District, Khyber Pakhtunkhwa, Pakistan. The population is 274,409 according to the 2017 census.

See also 
 Aka Khel
 Landi Kotal
 List of tehsils of Khyber Pakhtunkhwa

References 

Tehsils of Khyber Pakhtunkhwa
Populated places in Khyber District